Eric Leech (born 21 May 1951) is  a former Australian rules footballer who played with Richmond in the Victorian Football League (VFL).

Notes

External links 

Living people
1951 births
Australian rules footballers from Victoria (Australia)
Richmond Football Club players